Maciejewo  is a village in the administrative district of Gmina Osiek Mały, within Koło County, Greater Poland Voivodeship, in west-central Poland.

References

Villages in Koło County